Jimma Horo may refer to the following:

 Jimma Horo, East Welega, former woreda (district) in East Welega Zone, Oromia Region, Ethiopia
 Jimma Horo, Kelem Welega, current woreda (district) in Kelem Welega Zone, Oromia Region, Ethiopia